Vlasinje is a village in the municipalities of Mrkonjić Grad, Republika Srpska and Jajce, Bosnia and Herzegovina.

Demographics 
According to the 2013 census, its population was 845, with no one living in the Mrkonjić Grad part and primarily Bosniaks in the Jajce part.

References

Populated places in Jajce
Populated places in Mrkonjić Grad
Villages in Republika Srpska